The 1920 UCI Track Cycling World Championships were the World Championship for track cycling. They took place in Antwerp, Belgium from 6 to 8 August 1920. Three events for men were contested, two for professionals and one for amateurs.

Medal summary

Medal table

References

Track cycling
UCI Track Cycling World Championships by year
International cycle races hosted by Belgium
Sports competitions in Antwerp
1920 in track cycling
August 1920 sports events
1920s in Antwerp